The 1982–83 Tercera División season was the 6th season since establishment as the 4th tier.

League tables

Group I

Group II

Group III

Group IV

Group V

Group VI

Group VII

Group VIII

Group IX

Group X

Group XI

Group XII

Group XIII

Promotion playoff

First round

Final Round

Season records
 Most wins: 33, Constancia.
 Most draws: 16, Sangüesa, Rota and Torrevieja.
 Most losses: 30, Vélez.
 Most goals for: 111, Las Palmas Atlético.
 Most goals against: 104, Vélez.
 Most points: 69, Constancia.
 Fewest wins: 1, Vélez.
 Fewest draws: 2, Industrial de Melilla and Coria.
 Fewest losses: 2, Ensidesa and Constancia.
 Fewest goals for: 21, Burladés and El Palo.
 Fewest goals against: 16, Zamora.
 Fewest points: 9, Vélez.

Notes

External links
www.rsssf.com
www.futbolme.com

Tercera División seasons
4
Spain